Barbalin is a town situated in the Shire of Mukinbudin in Western Australia.

It is located approximately 245 km from Perth and covers an area of 165,342 km2. It has a recorded population of 24.

Barbalin's postcode is 6479.

The town's water scheme has been of concern and interest at different stages.

Notes 

Towns in Western Australia
Wheatbelt (Western Australia)